Edmunds may refer to:

People
Edmunds (given name)
Edmunds (surname)

Places
 Edmunds Center, an arena in Deland, Florida
 Edmunds County, South Dakota

Companies
 Edmunds (company), provider of automotive information

See also
 Edmonds (disambiguation)
 Edmund (disambiguation)